John Roe  may refer to:
John Septimus Roe (1797–1878), English naval surveyor and explorer of Western Australia
John Roe (footballer) (1938–1996), Scottish fullback
John Roe (rugby union) (born 1977), Australian rugby union player
John Roe (mathematician) (1959–2018), British mathematician.

See also
John Rowe (disambiguation)
John Roe (disambiguation)
Roe (disambiguation)#People